The 1996 DieHard 500 was the 18th stock car race of the 1996 NASCAR Winston Cup Series and the 28th iteration of the event. The race was held on Sunday, April 28, 1996, before an audience of 100,000 in Lincoln, Alabama at Talladega Superspeedway, a 2.66 miles (4.28 km) permanent triangle-shaped superspeedway. The race was shortened from its scheduled 188 laps to 129 laps due to darkness caused by rain delays and lengthy crash cleanups. At race's end, Hendrick Motorsports driver Jeff Gordon would manage to avoid numerous crashes and stay in front when the race was eventually called to take his 15th career NASCAR Winston Cup Series and his sixth victory of the season. To fill out the top three, Robert Yates Racing driver Dale Jarrett and Roush Racing driver Mark Martin would finish second and third, respectively.

On lap 117, a major crash involving 13 drivers, including the drivers of Dale Earnhardt and Sterling Marlin, would occur on the track's frontstretch. Marlin would be spun by hitting Ernie Irvan's front bumper, sending him into Earnhardt. Earnhardt would proceed to crash violently into the outside wall, sending Earnhardt into a flip before landing on all four wheels. In the midst of the chaos, others would be involved in the accident, with many placing blame on Irvan and Marlin for the crash. In the process, Earnhardt would be transported to the Carraway Methodist Medical Center in Birmingham, Alabama where he was diagnosed with a broken sternum and a broken left collarbone.

Background 

Talladega Superspeedway, originally known as Alabama International Motor Superspeedway (AIMS), is a motorsports complex located north of Talladega, Alabama. It is located on the former Anniston Air Force Base in the small city of Lincoln. The track is a tri-oval and was constructed in the 1960s by the International Speedway Corporation, a business controlled by the France family. Talladega is most known for its steep banking and the unique location of the start/finish line that's located just past the exit to pit road. The track currently hosts the NASCAR series such as the NASCAR Cup Series, Xfinity Series and the Camping World Truck Series. Talladega is the longest NASCAR oval with a length of 2.66-mile-long (4.28 km) tri-oval like the Daytona International Speedway, which also is a 2.5-mile-long (4 km) tri-oval.

Entry list 

 (R) denotes rookie driver.

Qualifying 
Qualifying was originally scheduled split into two rounds. The first round was held on Friday, July 26, at 4:00 PM EST. Each driver would have one lap to set a time. During the first round, the top 25 drivers in the round would be guaranteed a starting spot in the race. However, on Saturday, July 27, rain would eventually force the cancellation of second-round qualifying, and the decision was made that positions 26-38 would be determined by their first round qualifying speeds and depending on who needed it, a select amount of positions were given to cars who had not otherwise qualified but were high enough in owner's points; up to four provisionals were given. If needed, a past champion who did not qualify on either time or provisionals could use a champion's provisional, adding one more spot to the field.

Chad Little was the only driver to fail to qualify.

Full qualifying results

Race results

References 

DieHard 500
DieHard 500
NASCAR races at Talladega Superspeedway
July 1996 sports events in the United States